Sakri Assembly constituency is one of the 288 Vidhan Sabha constituencies of Maharashtra state in western India. This constituency is located in the Dhule district and it is reserved for the candidates belonging to the Scheduled tribes.

It is part of the Nandurbar Lok Sabha constituency along with another five Vidhan Sabha segments, namely Shirpur in Dhule district and Akkalkuwa, Navapur, Nandurbar and Shahada in the Nandurbar district.

As per orders of Delimitation of Parliamentary and Assembly constituencies Order, 2008, No. 6 Sakri Assembly constituency is composed of the following: Sakri Tehsil (excluding Dusane Circle). of Dhule district.

Members of Legislative Assembly
Key

Election results

Assembly Elections 2009

Assembly Elections 2014

Assembly Elections 2019

The election got interesting due to its three-dimensional nature. The independent candidate who was a former BJP member brought interest in the election by taking the issue of BJP deliberately neglecting its loyal party workers who have worked for the party for many decades. The Chairman of Dhule Zilla Parishad Shivajirao Dahite joined BJP ahead of elections, this created the anguish amongst all BJP voters and party workers and this affected the voting for BJP candidate. This is considered to be the biggest reason of win of independent candidate Smt. Manjulatai Gavit.

The elected Member of Legislative Assembly declared her support to Shivsena regarding the Government formation.

The election effectively changed the politics of Sakri Taluka and Sakri City.

See also
 Sakri
 List of constituencies of Maharashtra Vidhan Sabha
वंचित बहुजन आघाडी व सत्यशोधक कम्युनिस्ट पक्ष अधिकृत उमेदवार  :- मा यशवंत देवमन माळचे

References

Assembly constituencies of Maharashtra
Dhule district